Sophronica longiscapus is a species of beetle in the family Cerambycidae. It was described by Stephan von Breuning in 1943.

References

Sophronica
Beetles described in 1943